Bollingen is a village (Kirchdorf)  within the municipality of Rapperswil-Jona in the Swiss canton of St. Gallen.

Geography 
The village is located along the northern shore of the upper Lake Zürich (Obersee) between Jona and Schmerikon. Bollingen was part of the former municipality of Jona: On 1 January 2007 the former municipalities of Rapperswil and Jona merged to form the new political entity Rapperswil-Jona.

History 
Sandstone from Bollingen may have been used even in the Roman Empire era, but presumably Bollinger Sandstein is extracted and processed since 1000 AD. Among others it was used for the Grossmünster and Fraumünster churches in Zürich, as well as for the Einsiedeln and St. Gallen abbeys, or the Zunfthaus zur Meisen that was built in 1757 at the Münsterhof plaza in Zürich.

In the European Middle Ages, the two settlements named Unterbollingen and Oberbollingen are mentioned as part of the later Herrschaft Rapperswil of the Counts of Rapperswil. The earliest document sealed at the Rapperswil Castle was related to the donation of the church of Unterbollingen to the Rüti Abbey, and also mentions among others a civitas of the town of Rapperswil as witnesses of Count Rudolf von Rapperswil in 1229. On the peninsula at Oberbollingen, a St. Nicholas Chapel is mentioned, where around 1229 a small Cistercian nunnery, later Premonstratensian convent associated with the Rüti Abbey was established by the Counts of Rapperswil; in 1267 it was united with the nearby Mariazell Wurmsbach Abbey. In 1519 a new church in honor of St. Pancras was inaugurated in Unterbollingen. After the Reformation in Zürich the church was acquired by the city of Rapperswil to be united with the Heiliggeistspital, but since 1871 it is a parish church for its own.

Points of interest 
Bollingen is known for the "Tower" built there by Carl Gustav Jung. Another remarkable site is the nearby Wurmsbach Abbey.

Transportation 

There was a train station about halfway between the village and the Wurmsbach Abbey, which closed in 2004 for economic reasons. The railway building remained, but the platforms have been removed.

Since railway services were suspended, public transport was reduced to a bus service. West, a ca. 30 minute walk away from Bollingen village) The bus route, operated by Schneider Busbetriebe, is as follows:

Literature 
 Eugen Halter: Geschichte der Gemeinde Jona. Schweizer Verlagshaus, Zürich 1970.

References

External links 

 
 Dorfverein Bollingen 

Villages in the canton of St. Gallen
Former municipalities of the canton of St. Gallen
Cultural property of national significance in the canton of St. Gallen
Rapperswil-Jona
Populated places on Lake Zurich